Mundum (Bamundum) is a Grassfields Bantu language spoken in Cameroon. It is closely related to Mankon and Mendankwe-Nkwen; along with Mankon, it is called Ngemba. There are two dialects, Anyang and Mberewi.

Culture

References

Ngemba languages
Languages of Cameroon